Güvercin Islet ("Pigeon Islet") is a Mediterranean islet of Turkey. It is a part of Silifke ilçe (district) of Mersin Province. The islet is quite small; only . There are ruins of late Roman Empire era in this otherwise unnotable island. The ruins are in the north east side of the island . The ruins probably belonged to a mansion. The construction material is rectangular stone. There are tombs, ceramics and a part of a mosaic floor in the island.

References

Islands of Turkey
Islands of Mersin Province
Silifke District
Mediterranean islands